Up Front or Upfront may refer to:

Entertainment
Up Front (game), a card-based wargame
Upfront (advertising), a term used in the television industry for a meeting of network executives with advertisers and the press
The New York Times Upfront, a magazine for teenagers
Up-Front Group, a Japanese entertainment holding company
Up Front, a World War II memoir by cartoonist Bill Mauldin
Up Front (film), a 1951 film based on Bill Mauldin's characters Willie and Joe
Up Front, autobiography of footballer Kerry Dixon
Up the Front, a 1972 British comedy film

Music
UpFront Records, a record label
Up Front (freestyle band), a freestyle music group
Up Front (hardcore band), a hardcore punk band

Recordings
Upfront (David Sanborn album), 1992
Upfront (John Miles album), 1993
Upfront! Canadians Live from Mountain Stage, a 1994 compilation album released by BMG Music Canada
Up-Front (EP), a 1980 EP by the Fleshtones
"Up Front", a song by Diana Ross from Ross
 Up Front (album), a 1986 album led by bassist David Williams but often credited to pianist Cedar Walton